Mary Christmas may refer to:
 Mary Christmas (editor), editor of the magazine $pread
 Mary Christmas (film), a 2002 American Christmas movie

See also
 A Mary Christmas, a 2013 album by Mary J. Blige
 Merry Christmas (disambiguation)